De Vlaamse Pijl is a Belgian road bicycle race held annually since 1968. The race starts and ends in Harelbeke. From 2005 until 2012, it was rated as a 1.2 event on the UCI Europe Tour, however in 2013 the race was no longer held separately but became part of the Driedaagse van West-Vlaanderen stage race.

Winners

References

External links
 

UCI Europe Tour races
Cycle races in Belgium
Recurring sporting events established in 1968
1968 establishments in Belgium
Sport in Harelbeke